The bristletooth conger (Xenomystax congroides) is an eel in the family Congridae (conger/garden eels). It was described by David G. Smith and Robert H. Kanazawa in 1989. It is a marine, deep water-dwelling eel which is known from the western Atlantic Ocean, including northeastern Florida, U.S.A.; the Gulf of Mexico, the Amazon River, the Bahamas and the West Indies. It dwells at a depth range of 140–825 meters. Males can reach a maximum total length of 87.6 centimeters.

References

Congridae
Taxa named by David G. Smith
Taxa named by Robert H. Kanazawa
Fish described in 1989